Air Vice Marshal John Frederick Powell,  (12 June 1915 – 24 November 2008) was a long-serving officer at RAF College Cranwell.

RAF career
Powell was born in Somerset, and was educated at King's College School, Cambridge, Lancing College and King's College, Cambridge. He was commissioned into the special duties branch of the Royal Air Force Volunteer Reserve in 1939 and spent the Second World War with RAF Coastal Command in the operations room at RAF Aldergrove (1939–1945). He flew on operational sorties against U-boats and was mentioned in despatches.

After spells spent with the Air Ministry and the Ministry of Defence, Powell was appointed Command Education Officer, Bomber Command Headquarters (1964–1966) and then Officer Commanding RAF School of Education (1966–1967). He was elevated to the rank of air vice marshal in 1967 upon being appointed Director of Education Services, RAF. He was appointed an Officer of the Order of the British Empire in 1956.

Personal life
Powell married his wife Ysolda in 1939 and had four sons: 
Lord Powell of Bayswater (b.1941)
Sir Chris Powell (b. 1943)
Jonathan Powell (b.1956)
Roderick Powell.

Powell died on 24 November 2008.

References

External links
Kcl.ac.uk

1915 births
2008 deaths
Alumni of King's College, Cambridge
Officers of the Order of the British Empire
People educated at Lancing College
Royal Air Force air marshals
Royal Air Force Volunteer Reserve personnel of World War II
Royal Air Force pilots of World War II
Military personnel from Somerset